Ab Barik (also Romanized as Āb Bārīk; also known as Jū Bārīk) is a village in Deh Kahan Rural District, Aseminun District, Manujan County, Kerman Province, Iran. At the 2006 census, its population was 238, in 57 families.

References 

Populated places in Manujan County